Bernard Ockene (March 23, 1919 – April 26, 1974) was an American college basketball head coach for the Saint Peter's Peacocks between 1972 and 1974. When Don Kennedy was fired, then-assistant Ockene got promoted to lead the team. He coached them for the 1972–73 and 1973–74 seasons, compiling identical 8–18 records. Prior to Saint Peter's, Ockene was a successful coach at Bayonne High School in a very competitive North Jersey basketball environment.

Ockene died from a heart attack on April 26, 1974 in Bayonne Hospital. He was 55 years old.

Head coaching record

References

1919 births
1974 deaths
Basketball coaches from New Jersey
High school basketball coaches in the United States
Sportspeople from Bayonne, New Jersey
Saint Peter's Peacocks men's basketball coaches
Seton Hall University alumni
Sportspeople from Jersey City, New Jersey